William Gauthier better known as Eugenio Centenaro Kerrigan (1878 – December 25, 1956) was an Italian Brazilian film director and screenwriter best known for his work in the Cinema of Brazil in the 1920s. In Campinas, SP, he used to introduce himself as Count Eugenio Maria Piglione Rossiglioni de Farnet, and claimed to be born in Los Angeles in 1878.

Selected director filmography
Sofrer Para Gozar (1923)
Quando Elas Querem (1925)
Corações em Suplício (1926)
Amor que Redime (1928)
Revelação (1929)

External links and sources 

1878 births
1956 deaths
Brazilian film directors
Brazilian screenwriters
Italian film directors
20th-century Italian screenwriters
Italian male screenwriters
Film people from Modena
Italian emigrants to Brazil
20th-century Italian male writers